Heather Doerksen  (born February 12, 1980) is a Canadian actress who has appeared on stage and screen. She has also voiced many cartoons and advertising campaigns.

Career
Doerksen studied at Simon Fraser University, switching majors from science to theatre.  Doersken has played in a number of small television and film roles.  Her most notable roles are as Sasha Kaidanovsky in Pacific Rim, Sarah on Once Upon a Time in Wonderland and Captain Pat Meyers on Stargate: Atlantis.

Filmography

Film

Television

Video games

References

External links

Canadian film actresses
Canadian television actresses
Canadian video game actresses
Canadian voice actresses
Living people
Actresses from Winnipeg
1980 births
Canadian people of Danish descent
21st-century Canadian actresses